Siah Kuh may refer to:

 Siah Kuh, Amlash, Gilan Province, Iran
 Siah Kuh, Sowme'eh Sara, Gilan Province, Iran